Michael Sclanders (born 30 March 2000) is a South African cricketer. He made his first-class debut on 29 October 2021, for KwaZulu-Natal Inland in the 2021–22 CSA 4-Day Series. He made his List A debut on 18 March 2022, for KwaZulu-Natal Inland in the 2021–22 CSA One-Day Cup.

References

External links
 

2000 births
Living people
South African cricketers
KwaZulu-Natal Inland cricketers
Place of birth missing (living people)
Alumni of Hilton College (South Africa)